2Day FM (call sign: 2DAY) is an English language commercial FM radio station broadcasting in Suva, Fiji, on the frequencies of 95.4 MHz in Suva, Nadi, Lautoka, Yasawa, Labasa, Savusavu, and Taveuni, on 95.2 MHz in Sigatoka and Ba, 95.6 MHz in Tavua and Vatukoula, and 95.8 MHz in Rakiraki and is part of Fiji Broadcasting Corporation's Network, The National Broadcaster of Fiji, who also owns FBC TV, Radio Fiji One, Radio Fiji Two, Bula FM, Gold FM (Fiji), and Mirchi FM in Fiji.

The station strives to educate, inspire and inform the youths while playing today's hit music.

History

2002

2day FM was launched on 31 December 2002 under the then Fiji Broadcasting Corporation Limited with its first Logo and original slogan ""The Home of Today's Hit Music""

The music selection runs from 1999 until the present. It plays a selection of RnB, hip-hop, rock, rap, pop, dance music, and reggae. The station is a major supporter of local music in Fiji promoting up and coming local musicians and their work, also holding numerous events promoting Homegrown Music.

2009

2day FM underwent a revamp and re-brand in August 2009 with a new look logo symbolizing a new outlook for FBC and its sister stations under the Fijian Broadcasting Corporation.

Shows

 Biscuits For Breakfast
 Midway Thrill
 The Traffic Jam
 The System After Dark
 Weekend Breakfast
 Weekend Drive
 The Kryp2nyt Show
 The Sunday Night Kruizer

Schedule

Weekdays 

 Biscuits For Breakfast (Breakfast Show) - Time: 05:45AM – 10:00AM, with Bob & Sharon
 Midway Thrill - Time: 10:00AM – 02:00PM, with Jane
 Retro Hour - Time: 02:00PM – 03:00PM (Talk Free Hour)
 Traffic Jam - Time: 03:00PM – 07:00PM, with Pauline & Pita
 System After Dark - Time: 07:00PM – 12:00AM, With Ses

The Weekend Shows 

 Weekend Breakfast - Time: 06:00AM – 12:00PM
 Weekend Drive - Time: 12:00PM – 06:00PM
 The Kryp2nyt Show - Time: 06:00PM – 12:00AM (Saturday)
 The Sunday Night Kruizer - Time: 06:00PM – 12:00AM

References 

English-language radio stations
Radio stations in Fiji